Plants of the World Online (POWO) is an online database published by the Royal Botanic Gardens, Kew. It was launched in March 2017 with the ultimate aim being "to enable users to access information on all the world's known seed-bearing plants by 2020". The initial focus was on tropical African Floras, particularly Flora Zambesiaca, Flora of West Tropical Africa and Flora of Tropical East Africa.

The database uses the same taxonomical source as Kew's World Checklist of Selected Plant Families, which is the International Plant Names Index, and the World Checklist of Vascular Plants (WCVP). POWO contains 1,234,000 global plant names and 367,600 images.

See also
Australian Plant Name Index
Convention on Biological Diversity
World Flora Online
Tropicos

References

Online botany databases
Online taxonomy databases
.
Plant taxonomy
Royal Botanic Gardens, Kew
Databases in the United Kingdom